This is a partial list of universities and colleges located within the Metro Cebu area only, Philippines.

Note:
 Boldface indicates a school which holds university status
 An asterisk (*) indicates a state school, college, or university
 A double asterisk (**) indicates a locally funded school, college, or university.

Universities

C
 Cebu Doctors' University
 Cebu Institute of Technology–University
 Cebu Normal University*
 Cebu Technological University* (Main Campus)
 Cebu Technological University – Danao Satellite Campus*
 Cebu Technological University – City of Naga Extension Campus*
 Cebu Technological University – San Fernando Extension Campus*

S
 Southwestern UniversityU
 University of Cebu (Main Campus)
 University of Cebu – Banilad Campus
 University of Cebu – Lapu-Lapu & Mandaue Campus
 University of Cebu – Maritime Education and Training Center (METC)
 University of Cebu – Pardo–Talisay Campus (formerly St. Paul College Foundation, Inc. – Bulacao Campus)
 University of San Carlos (Downtown Campus)
 University of San Carlos – Talamban Campus (USC-TC)
 University of San Jose–Recoletos (Main Campus)
 University of San Jose–Recoletos – Basak Campus
 University of Southern Philippines Foundation University of the Philippines Cebu*
 University of the Visayas''' (Main Campus)
 University of the Visayas – Danao Campus
 University of the Visayas – Gullas College of Medicine
 University of the Visayas – Mandaue Campus
 University of the Visayas – Minglanilla Campus

Colleges and institutes

A
 Academy for Creating Enterprise
 ACLC College of Mandaue
 AMA Computer College
 Asian College of Technology (Main Campus)
 Asian College of Technology – Bulacao Campus
 Asian College of Technology – Cyber Tower 2 Campus
 Asian College of Technology – Pit-os Campus

B
 Baptist Theological College
 Benedicto College – Cebu City Campus
 Benthel Asia School of Technology

C
 CBD College
 Cebu Aeronautical Technical School
 Cebu Eastern College
 Cebu Institute of Medicine
 Cebu Mary Immaculate College
 Cebu Roosevelt Memorial Colleges
 Cebu Sacred Heart College
 Cebu Sacred Heart College – Talisay
 Cebu Sacred Heart College – Carcar
 Cebu School of Midwifery
 Central Philippine Bible College, Inc.
 Centre for International Education Global Colleges
 Colegio de la Inmaculada Concepcion – Cebu
 Colegio de San Antonio de Padua
 Colegio del Santo Niño de Cebu
 Colegio del Santo Niño – Augustinian
 College of Technological Sciences–Cebu
 Collegium Societatis Angeli Pacis
 Concord Technical Institute

D
 Don Bosco Technical College–Cebu

E
 Evangelical Theological College of the Philippines

G
 Golden Success College
 Gullas College of Medicine

I
 Immanuel Bible College
 Indiana School of Aeronautics (also known as Indiana Aerospace University)
 Informatics College Cebu
 Informatics Institute Consolacion, Cebu
 International Academy of Film and Television

L
 La Consolacion College Liloan
 Lapulapu-Cebu International College
 Lapu-Lapu City College**
 Larmen de Guia Memorial College
 Lyceum of Cebu

M
 Mandaue City College**
 Mary’s Children Formation College
 Matias H. Aznar Memorial College of Medicine
 Microsystems International Institute of Technology

N
 Northeastern Cebu Colleges

P
 Philippine State College of Aeronautics – Mactan Benito Ebuen Air Base*
 Professional Academy of the Philippines

R
 Rizwoods Colleges
 Royal Christian College

S
 San Roque College de Cebu
 Saint Catherine's College
 Saint Louis College of Cebu
 Saint Theresa's College of Cebu
 Salazar Colleges of Science and Institute of Technology (Main Campus)
 SCSIT – Talisay Campus
 San Carlos Seminary College
 St. Cecilia's College–Cebu, Inc.
 St. Paul College Foundation, Inc.
 SPCFI – Ramos Campus
 SPCFI – Mandaue Campus
 STI College – Cebu
 Sto. Tomas College

T
 Tabor Hills College
 Talisay City College**
 Trade-Tech International Science Institute

V
 Velez College
 Visayan Nazarene Bible College

See also
 List of colleges and universities in Metro Manila
 List of colleges and universities in Davao City
 List of colleges and universities in the Philippines
 Higher education in the Philippines

References

External links
 List of Higher Education Institutions - CHED
 Universities and colleges in Cebu City, Cebu
 List of Cebu Schools | Everything Cebu

Universities and colleges in Cebu City
Metro Cebu
Cebu